The M5 is a manual transaxle.

Applications 
 Mercury Tracer (1991 - 1996)
 Ford Escort (1.8L, 1.9L, 2.0L)
 Ford Festiva
 Ford Probe (2.2L non-turbo & turbo)

Mazda
Ford Motor Company
Automotive technology tradenames